Roy Clippinger (January 13, 1886 – December 24, 1962) was a U.S. Representative from Illinois.

Born in Fairfield, Illinois, Clippinger attended the public schools.
Learned the printer's trade and engaged in the newspaper business.
He was publisher and editor 1909–1961.
Founder and president of the Board of Greater Weeklies, New York City.
He served as president of the Carmi, Illinois, Hospital Association 1945–1948.
Manager of the White County, Illinois, Bridge Commission 1941–1961.
He engaged in the furniture business 1947–1950.

Clippinger was elected as a Republican to the Seventy-ninth Congress to fill the vacancy caused by the death of James V. Heidinger.
He was reelected in 1946 to the Eightieth Congress and served from November 6, 1945, to January 3, 1949.
He was not a candidate for renomination in 1948.
He resumed his former business pursuits.
He was a resident of Carmi, Illinois, where he died on December 24, 1962.
He was interred in I.O.O.F. Cemetery, McLeansboro, Illinois.

References

1886 births
1962 deaths
Republican Party members of the United States House of Representatives from Illinois
People from Wayne County, Illinois
20th-century American politicians
People from Carmi, Illinois